Nikken Sekkei (日建設計) is an architectural, planning and engineering firm from Japan, with headquarters in Chiyoda, Tokyo. Today (2019), Nikken Sekkei ranks as the second largest architectural practice in the world.

Staff and Offices
As of 2019, the group employs 2,685 workers and has completed more than 25,000 projects in more than 50 countries. Nikken Sekkei's International offices are in Tokyo, Shanghai, Beijing, Dalian, Seoul, Hanoi, Ho Chi Minh City, Singapore, Dubai, Riyadh, Moscow, Barcelona; while the Japanese branches are located in: Osaka, Nagoya, Fukuoka, and Sendai. The newest office opened in 2018 in Bangkok, Thailand.

History
Nikken Sekkei dates its origins back to 1900, as an offspring of  Sumitomo Corporation. Under the name of Sumitomo Temporary Architecture Department, it was founded in response to Sumitomo's need to establish a headquarters. The company established its independence from the Sumitomo Corporation in the 1950s under the name Nikken Sekkei Komu Co. Ltd. As a private practice since 1970, Nikken Sekkei has maintained its In-house Shareholder Corporate System and is partly owned by its employees.

Nikken Sekkei together with Nikken Sekkei Research Institute (NSRI), Hokkaido Nikken Sekkei, Nikken Sekkei Civil Engineering (NSC), Nikken Housing System Ltd (NHS), Nikken Space Design (NSD), Nikken Sekkei Construction Management (NCM) forms the Nikken Group.

President and CEO 
Tadao Kamei has served as CEO and President of Nikken Sekkei since 2015.

Selected projects
 Osaka Library, 1904
 Sumitomo Mitsui Banking Corporation Osaka Head Office, 1930
 Tokyo Tower, 1958
 San’ai Dream Center, Tokyo, 1963
 Shinjuku NS Building, Tokyo, 1982
 Tokyo Dome, 1988
 Trade Tower, Seoul, South Korea, 1988
 Cairo Opera House, 1988
 Pacifico Yokohama, 1991
 Islamic development Bank Headquarters, Jeddah, 1993
 Dubai Chamber of Commerce building, 1995
 Queen's Square Yokohama, 1997
 Saitama Super Arena, 2000
 Bank of China Tower, 2000
 Kyoto State Guest House, 2005
 Tokyo Midtown, 2007
 Hoki Museum, 2010
 The Ritz-Carlton Kyoto, 2013
 Guangzhou Library, 2013
 Ruentex Nangang Station Complex, 2014
 YKK 80 Building, 2015
 Tokyo Plaza Ginza, 2016
 Ariake Gymnastics Centre, 2019
 One Za'abeel, 2022

Among other notable projects, Nikken Sekkei was the primary architectural firm for the Tokyo Skytree, currently (2019) the tallest self-supporting broadcasting tower in the world, and second tallest man made structure of any kind.

In 2016 it has been selected by FC Barcelona for the redesign of the largest stadium in Europe. and in 2018, Sumitomo Forestry, in collaboration with Nikken Sekkei, announced the study of W350 Project, the future tallest timber tower (350 meters) and Japan tallest building.

Group companies 

 Nikken Sekkei Research Institute (NSRI): Focused on the environment, energy and city management fields. It conducts researches, making policy recommendations and surveys, project and planning support services. 
 Hokkaido Nikken Sekkei: Specialized in architectural design and programming; urban, regional, and environmental planning, and related investigation and consulting for extreme-cold weather condition regions. 
 Nikken Sekkei Civil Engineering (NSC): Specialized in urban development, urban infrastructure, manufacturing facilities, geotechnical and marine environment investigation, planning, design management and consulting services. 
 Nikken Housing System Ltd (NHS): Specialized multiple dwelling complex planning, design and administration together with the related surveying, research, and product development. 
 Nikken Space Design (NSD): Specialized in space design and administration services, focusing on architectural interiors, furniture and component design. 
 Nikken Sekkei Construction Management (NCM): Specialized in construction management incorporating advances technology services throughout every stage of a construction project.

References

External links

Architecture firms of Japan
Service companies based in Tokyo
Engineering companies of Japan
Japanese companies established in 1900
Design companies established in 1900
Japanese brands